Roy Cleveland Sullivan (February 7, 1912 – September 28, 1983) was an American park ranger in Shenandoah National Park in Virginia. Between 1942 and 1977, Sullivan was claimed to have been hit by lightning on seven occasions, surviving all of them. For this reason, he gained the nicknames "Human Lightning Conductor" and "Human Lightning Rod". Sullivan is recognized by Guinness World Records as the person struck by lightning more recorded times than any other human being.

Personal life 
Roy was born in Greene County, Virginia, on February 7, 1912. He started working as a ranger in Shenandoah National Park in 1936. Sullivan was described as a brawny man with a broad, rugged face, who resembled the actor Gene Hackman. He was told to have been avoided by people during the later years of his life, owing to fears of being struck by lightning, and that saddened him. He once recalled "For instance, I was walking with the Chief Ranger one day when lightning struck way off (in the distance). The Chief said, "I'll see you later".

On the morning of September 28, 1983, Sullivan died at the age of 71 from a self-inflicted gunshot wound to the head. Two of his ranger hats are on display at two Guinness World Exhibit Halls in New York City and South Carolina.

Seven strikes 

Sullivan described in detail each of the alleged strike encounters.

 Sullivan's first documented lightning strike was in April 1942. He was said to have been hiding from a thunderstorm in a fire lookout tower. The tower was newly built and had no lightning rod at the time; it was said to have been struck seven to eight times. Sullivan described a scene from within the tower, saying that "fire was jumping all over the place". Sullivan was said to then have run out from the burning tower, just before being struck a few feet away by lightning. It burned a half-inch strip all along his right leg, hit his toe, and left a hole in his shoe.
 He was hit again in July 1969. Unusually, he was hit while in his truck, driving on a mountain road – the metal body of a vehicle normally protects people from lightning strikes by acting as a Faraday cage. The lightning first hit nearby trees and was deflected into the open window of the truck. The strike knocked Sullivan unconscious, burned off his eyebrows and eyelashes, and set his hair on fire. The uncontrolled truck kept moving until it stopped near a cliff edge.
 In July 1970, Sullivan was struck while in his front yard. The lightning hit a nearby power transformer and from there jumped to his left shoulder, searing it.
 In spring 1972, Sullivan was working inside a ranger station in Shenandoah National Park when he was struck again. It set his hair on fire; he tried to smother the flames with his jacket. He then rushed to the restroom, but could not fit under the water tap and so used a wet towel instead. Although he never was a fearful man, after the fourth strike he began to believe that some force was trying to destroy him and he acquired a fear of death. For months, whenever he was caught in a storm while driving his truck, he would pull over and lie down on the front seat until the storm passed. He also began to believe that he would somehow attract lightning even if he stood in a crowd of people, and carried a can of water with him in case his hair was set on fire.
 On August 7, 1973, while he was out on patrol in the park, Sullivan saw a storm cloud forming and drove away quickly. But the cloud, he said later, seemed to be following him. When he finally thought he had outrun it, he decided it was safe to leave his truck. Soon after, he was struck by a lightning bolt. Sullivan stated that he actually saw the bolt that hit him. The lightning moved down his left arm and left leg and knocked off his shoe. It then crossed over to his right leg just below the knee. Still conscious, Sullivan crawled to his truck and poured the can of water, which he always kept there, over his head, which was on fire.
 The next strike, on June 5, 1976, injured his ankle. It was reported that he saw a cloud, thought that it was following him, tried to run away, but was struck anyway. His hair also caught fire.
 On June 25, 1977, Sullivan was struck while fishing in a freshwater pool. The lightning hit the top of his head, set his hair on fire, traveled down, and burnt his chest and stomach. Sullivan turned to his car when something unexpected occurred – a bear approached the pond and tried to steal trout from his fishing line. Sullivan had the strength and courage to strike the bear with a tree branch, despite the fact that his hair was on fire. He claimed that this was the twenty-second time he hit a bear with a stick in his lifetime.

All seven strikes were documented by the superintendent of Shenandoah National Park, R. Taylor Hoskins. Hoskins, however, was never present at any of the reported strikes and was not an active and present superintendent in Shenandoah National Park for many of the times Sullivan was supposedly struck. Sullivan himself recalled that the first time he was struck by lightning was not in 1942 but much earlier. When he was a child, he was helping his father to cut wheat in a field, when a thunderbolt struck the blade of his scythe without injuring him. But because he could not prove the fact later, he never claimed it.

Sullivan's wife was also struck once, when a storm suddenly arrived as she was out hanging clothes in their back yard. Her husband was helping her at the time, but escaped unharmed.

Statistics 

The odds of being struck by lightning for over the period of 80 years have been roughly estimated as 1:10000. If the lightning strikes were independent events, the probability of being hit seven times would be (1:10000)7 = 1:1028 or 1 in 10,000,000,000,000,000,000,000,000,000. These numbers do not quite apply to Sullivan, however, who by the nature of his work and his physical location was exposed to more storms than the average person. Virginia, where he lived, averages 35 to 45 thunderstorm days per year, most of which fall in June, July, and August. Between 1959 and 2000, lightning killed 58 people and injured at least 238 people in Virginia. In the United States, 3,239 people were killed and 13,057 injured by lightning in the same period. Most of those were males between 20 and 40 years old caught outdoors.

In popular culture 
 The lyrics on the 2005 album 3 Songs by I Hate Myself are inspired by how Sullivan was lucky enough to survive being repeatedly struck by lightning.
 In the 2008 film The Curious Case of Benjamin Button, the character Mr. Daws often tells the title character that he was "struck by lightning seven times" (a detail that does not appear in the original 1922 short story)

 In the 2016 game Firewatch, a game about a volunteer park ranger, Sullivan is mentioned when the main character says lightning doesn’t strike twice. The character Delilah then mentions Sullivan being struck 7 times as well as his death by suicide.

 The 2021 short film Don vs Lightning is inspired by Sullivan's story.

See also 
 Lightning injury

References

External links 
National Weather Service Lightning Safety Information

1912 births
1983 suicides
National Park Service personnel
Injuries from lightning strikes
People from Greene County, Virginia
Suicides by firearm in Virginia
People from Augusta County, Virginia
1983 deaths